Kanakadurga is an Indian actress best known for her work in Malayalam cinema. She hails from Vijayawada, Andhra Pradesh.  She debuted in the Malayalam movie Nellu as Kurumatti. She has acted in a few Tamil, Kannada and Telugu movies as well. She married Malayalam cinematographer Hemachandran and her daughter Manasa has acted in few Malayalam movieslike Big B, Kaakki, Jubilee, Calcutta News, The Snake And Ladder etc.,Telugu movies like Nandanavanam 120 km, Shankar, Tamil serial Uthiripookkal and later married Tamil actor Vikranth. She is now acting in tele films and soap operas.

Filmography

Malayalam
 Jayan - The man behind the legend (2010) - documentary as Herself 
 Soothradharan (2001) as Bharathi Akka
 Vetta (1984)
 Ente Gramam (1984)
 Enne Njaan Thedunnu (1983) as Sharada
 Ithum Oru Jeevitham (1982) as Rathi
 Kaalam (1982)
 Marupacha (1982) as Durga
 Koritharicha Naal (1982)
 Kodumudikal (1981)
 Thadavara (1981) as Devaki
 Ariyapedatha Rahasyam (1981) as Sarojam
 Kaattukallan (1981) 
 Randu Mukhangal (1981)
 Kaattupothu (1981)
 Agnikshethram (1980) as Shantha
 Aarohanam (1980) as Devi
 Idimuzhakkam (1980) as Gayathridevi/Marykutti
 Makaravilakku (1980)
 Pralayam (1980) as Lekshmi
 Shakthi (1980)
 Karimpana (1980)
 Ival Ee Vazhi Ithuvare (1980)
 Abhimanyu (1980)
 Agnivyooham (1979)
 Sikharangal (1979)
 Simhaasanam (1979) as Madhavi
 Irumbazhikal (1979) as Sainaba
 Tharangam (1979) as Janu
 Avano Atho Avalo (1979)
 Vijayam Nammude Senani (1979)
 Valeduthavan Valal(1979)
 Rakthamillatha Manushyan(1979)
 Kathirmandapam (1979)
 Nizhalukal Roopangal (1979)
 Uthradaraathri (1978)
 Ithaa Oru Manushyan (1978)
 Lisa (1978) as Former Hostel Warden
 Snehathinte Mukhangal (1978) as Savithri
 Etho Oru Swapnam (1978) as Sathyavathi
 Hemantharaathri (1978)
 Adavukal Pathinettu (1978)
 Vadakakku Oru Hridayam (1978) as Malini
 Ashtamangalyam (1977)
 Nurayum Pathayum (1977)
 Karnaparvam (1977)
 Thuruppugulan (1977)
 Mohiniyaattam (1976) as Anasooya
 Themmadi Velappan (1976) as Madhavi
 Pick Pocket (1976) as Madhavikutty/Gourimatha
 Theekkanal (1976)
 Thomasleeha (1975)
 Raasaleela (1975)
 Nellu (1974) as Kurumatti
 Mazhakkaaru (1973) as Malathi
 Nirthashala (1972) as Sindhu

Tamil
 Oli Vilakku (1968) as paired with Cho
 Enga Oor Raja (1968) as Vijaya
 Sorgam (1970) as Lakshmi
 Savaale Samali (1971) as Jayalalitha's friend
 Arunodhayam (1971)
 Veettuku oru Pillai (1971)
 Apoorva Raagangal (1975)Pon Megalai (2005)

Telugu
 Private Master (1967)
 Manchi Kutumbam (1968) as Kamala
 Andala Ramudu (1973)  as Classical dancer
 Abhimanavanthulu (1973)
 Nindu Kutumbam (1973)
 Sri Kanakadurga Mahima (1973)

Kannada
 Maya Manushya'' (1976)

References

External links

Kanakadurga at MSI

Actresses in Malayalam cinema
Actresses in Tamil cinema
Indian film actresses
Actresses in Telugu cinema
Actresses in Kannada cinema
20th-century Indian actresses
21st-century Indian actresses
Actresses from Vijayawada